Tirathaba citrinoides is a species of moth of the family Pyralidae. It was described by Whalley in the year 1964 . It is found on the Bismarck Archipelago.

References 

Tirathabini
Moths described in 1964